The Hilton sisters may refer to:
 Paris Hilton and Nicky Hilton heirs to the Hilton Hotels Corporation estate
 Hilton twins, conjoined twins born in 1908